Brookula annectens is a species of minute sea snail, a marine gastropod mollusc, unassigned in the superfamily Seguenzioidea.

Description
The height of the shell reaches 1 mm.

Distribution
This species occurs in the vicinity of the Three Kings Islands, New Zealand.

References

 Powell A. W. B., New Zealand Mollusca, William Collins Publishers Ltd, Auckland, New Zealand 1979

External links
 Discovery Reports, National Institute of Oceanography of Great Britain, v. 15 1937, p. 183

annectens
Gastropods described in 1937